Vicente Belda Vicedo (born 12 September 1954) is a Spanish former professional road bicycle racer, born in Alfafara. He is now the manager of Spanish UCI Professional Continental outfit Fuerteventura–Canarias. Until 2006 he was the directeur sportif of Comunidad Valenciana, which was highly involved in the Operación Puerto doping case.

Belda received a penalty for testing positive for the stimulant Methylphenidate (Ritalin) on stage 17 of the 1982 Vuelta a España.

Major results

1978
1st, Stage 16, Vuelta a España
1st, Overall, Vuelta a Cantabria
1979
1st,  Overall, Volta a Catalunya
1st, Stage 4, Vuelta a Andalucía
1st, Overall, Volta a la Comunitat Valenciana
1st Prologue
1980
1st, Stage 6, Tour of the Basque Country
1981
3rd Overall Vuelta a España
1st, Stage 13
1st, Stage 4, Volta a Catalunya
1982
1st, Clásica a los Puertos de Guadarrama
1st, Stage 3, Vuelta a La Rioja
1st, Stage 16, Giro d'Italia
1983
1st, Subida al Naranco
1st, Stage 3, Tour of the Basque Country
1984
1st, Subida al Naranco
1st, Subida a Urkiola
1st, Overall, Volta a Galicia
1st Stage 3
1985
1st, Escalada a Montjuïc
1st, Stage 8 & 10, Vuelta a Colombia
1986
1st, Escalada a Montjuïc
1987
1st, Setmana Catalana de Ciclisme

See also
 List of doping cases in cycling

References

External links

1954 births
Living people
People from Comtat
Sportspeople from the Province of Alicante
Cyclists from the Valencian Community
Doping cases in cycling
Spanish sportspeople in doping cases
Spanish male cyclists